Calliotropis excelsior is a species of sea snail, a marine gastropod mollusk in the family Eucyclidae.

Description
The shell can grow to be 24 mm.

Distribution
This species occurs in the Pacific Ocean off Fiji and New Caledonia.

References

 Vilvens C. (2007) New records and new species of Calliotropis from Indo-Pacific. Novapex 8 (Hors Série 5): 1–72.

External links

excelsior
Gastropods described in 2004